The Cup of Excellence is an annual competition held in several countries to identify the highest quality coffees produced. It is organised by the Alliance for Coffee Excellence, which was founded by George Howell, Susie Spindler and Silvio Leite.

Format 
The winning coffees are sold in internet auctions. The concept was developed by the Gourmet Coffee Project of the International Coffee Organization (ICO). This project was devised by Pablo Dubois, Head of Operations of the ICO and Frans Bolvenkel, of the International Trade Centre (ITC) at a meeting in Geneva in late 1994. This project, supervised by the ICO, managed by the ITC and largely financed by the Common Fund for Commodities, ran from 1995 to 2000, and  aimed to develop methodologies for the creation of new "gourmet" or high-quality speciality coffees. The Cup of Excellence competition has been dubbed as the 'Oscars of the coffee world'.

History 
The competitions began in 1999. As of 2020, competitions are held in Brazil, Colombia, Peru, El Salvador, Costa Rica, Nicaragua, Guatemala, Honduras, Mexico, Burundi, Ethiopia, and Rwanda. In the course of the competition each coffee is tested at least five times. Only those coffees that get high scores continuously move forward in the competition. The final winners are awarded the Cup of Excellence and sold via an internet auction to the highest bidder.

Notable competitors 

 Aida Batllee.

See also

References

Further reading

External links
 https://allianceforcoffeeexcellence.org/

Awards established in 1999
Food and drink awards
Coffee culture